Longyao may refer to:

Dragon kiln, a traditional kiln used for Chinese ceramics
Longyao County, a county in southern Hebei, China, under the administration of Xingtai
Longyao Town, in Longyao County